Bonaparti.lv was a sextet consisting of Latvian tenors, that participated in Eurovision Song Contest 2007 with their song "Questa Notte" (Tonight).

In 2006 Swedish composer Kjell Jennstig composed a song named "Tonight", which he handed in to Eirodziesma 2007 - the Latvian national qualification for the Eurovision Song Contest. The rules of Eirodziesma envisages, that there must be Latvian artists, so Jennstig found six Latvian tenors, who founded the new band - Bonaparti.lv. The members of this project are three members of Latvian band "Labvēlīgais Tips", Normunds Jakušonoks, Kaspars Tīmanis and Andris Ābelīte, lead singer of "Bet Bet" Zigfrīds Muktupāvels, lead singer of "Cacao" Andris Ērglis, and Roberto Meloni, an Italian-born Latvian immigrant who was originally entered in Eirodziesma 2007 with "Feels Like Heaven" a duet performed with Stacey (as a result of Meloni's recruitment for Bonaparti.lv "Feels Like Heaven" would be performed in Eirodziesma 2007 by Stacey solo). The lyrics and name of the song became Italian, and the new title was "Questa Notte".

On February 3, 2007 Bonaparti.lv won the 2nd semi-final of Eirodziesma with 9909 votes. On February 24 they at first won the 1st round of final, and then along with 2 other contestants competed in superfinal. Bonaparti.lv with "Questa notte" had a convincing victory with 49,422 votes, which was more than 3 times more than the 2nd place had.

On May 10, Bonaparti.lv qualified to the final of the Eurovision Song Contest 2007, by finishing in the top 10 of the semi-final. In the final, they presented their song in the 14th position, following France and preceding Russia and got 16th place in final voting.

External links
 Video of song "Questa Notte" at the Final of Eurovision 2007
 Video of song "Questa Notte" at the Semifinal of Eurovision 2007

Latvian pop music groups
Eurovision Song Contest entrants for Latvia
Eurovision Song Contest entrants of 2007
Tenors